Hossein Khajeh Amiri, more commonly known as Iraj (born 1 January 1933), is an Iranian singer.

References

www.iranold.net

1933 births
Living people
20th-century Iranian male singers
Male singers on Golha